The Small and Medium Business Administration (SMBA) was one of a small and medium industry organizations in South Korea and is run under the Ministry of Trade, Industry and Energy. The headquarters are in Seo District, Daejeon.

From July 2017, Ministry of SMEs and Startups succeeds the organisation.

See also

Small Enterprise and Market Service
Ministry of SMEs and Startups

References

External links
Official website 

Government agencies of South Korea
Organizations related to small and medium-sized enterprises